Aleksander Walerianczyk (born 1 September 1982, in Kraków) is a former Polish high jumper.

He finished thirteenth at the 2002 European Championships in Munich, tenth at the 2003 World Championships in Paris and fifth at the 2007 European Indoor Championships in Birmingham. He won the 2005 Summer Universiade in Izmir.

His personal best jump is 2.36 metres, achieved in July 2003 in Bydgoszcz.

Waleriańczyk tested positive for caffeine at Hochsprungmeeting in Eberstadt 27 July 2003 and received a public warning.

Competition record

References

 

1982 births
Doping cases in athletics
Polish sportspeople in doping cases
Living people
Polish male high jumpers
Universiade medalists in athletics (track and field)
Sportspeople from Kraków
Universiade gold medalists for Poland
Medalists at the 2005 Summer Universiade